The 1884–85 British Home Championship was the second football tournament between the Home Nations and was, like the previous competition, won by a Scottish team which completely dominated proceedings. The English also performed well, beginning with a strong victory over Ireland but failing to capitalise on this start with 1–1 draws with Wales and Scotland. The Welsh thrashed Ireland 8–1 but were well beaten 8–2 by the Scots who won their final game in a similar scoreline against the Irish, who finished last having conceded 20 goals in three games. The Scots, who had scored 16 goals two games, would win (individually or shared) six of the first seven tournaments.

Table

Results

Winning squad

References

Brit
Brit
Brit
Brit
Home Championship
British Home Championships